Consumer culture describes a lifestyle hyper-focused on spending money to buy material goods. It is often attributed to, but not limited to, the capitalist economy of the United States. From 1900 to 2000, market goods came to dominate American life, and for the first time in history, consumerism had no practical limits. Consumer culture has provided affluent societies with peaceful alternatives to tribalism and class war. It has fuelled extraordinary economic growth. The challenge for the future is to find ways to revive the valid portion of the culture of constraint and control the overpowering success of the twentieth century.

Types of culture 
Social scientists Arthur Berger, Aaron Wildavsky, and Mary Douglas suggest that there are four political cultures, which also function as consumer cultures: hierarchical or elitist, individualist, egalitarian, and fatalist.
 An elitist is a person who believes that a system or society should be ruled or dominated by an elite.
 An individualist is a person who does things without being concerned about what other people will think.
 An egalitarian believes in the principle that all people are equal and deserve equal rights and opportunities.
 A fatalist is someone who believes that outcomes will be the same because it is predetermined regardless of any other action.
Consumer culture is based on the idea of demographics, which is targeting a large group of people with similar interests, traits or cultural attributes.

Mass market theory

Advertising and strategies 
  
Over the years, people of different age groups are employed by marketing companies to help understand the beliefs, attitudes, values, and past behaviours of the targeted consumers. Target marketing creates a more effective advertisement than the normal data-gathering strategy that is commonly used.

A quote by Shah states that "The sophistication of advertising done methods and techniques has advanced, enticing and shaping and even creating consumerism and needs where there has been none before."

Richard Wilk has written an article about bottled water and the consumerist basis it has in society. The base point of this article is to point out how water is free and it is abundant, but over time it has become a point of marketing. The debate has always existed if there is a real difference in taste between bottled water and tap water. When it comes down to it, during many blind tastes, people can not even tell which was tap and which was bottled, and more often than not tap water won for better taste. Water has always been regarded as a pure substance and has connections in many religions. Throughout history, it has been shown that control over water is equivalent to control over untamed nature, and this has been shown in movies as well. To build on this idea, Wilk points out how having bottled water enforces the idea of this control over nature and the need that humans have for water. To further enforce this idea of natural and pure water, a 1999 report by the National Resources Defense Council found that many water companies use words like “pure” and “pristine” to aid in marketing. Wilk explains that it is more than just the marketing of it being pure, but that people want bottled water because they know the source. Public water comes from an anonymous source and Wilk concludes that the home is an extension of ourselves, so why would we want to bring an unknown specimen into our home? This is where the bottled water preference comes in, according to Wilk, because people can trace it back to where it came from. In addition to this idea, many brands and companies have started marketing water toward specific needs like special water for women, kids, athletes, and so on. This increases competition between brands and takes away from customers being able to choose what water they want. This is due to the larger companies being able to make more connections and pay the expensive fee to be sold on the shelves. Wilk concludes that since it is hard to trust either, it comes down to which is distrusted least.

Labor 
Consumer culture has had a large impact on the lives of workers.

Wage work 

Before the Industrial Revolution, the home was a place where men and women produced, consumed, and worked. The men were highly valued workers, such as barbers, butchers, farmers, and lumbermen who brought income into the house. The wives of these men completed various tasks to save money which included, churning butter, fixing clothes, and tending the garden. This system created an equal value for all of the jobs and tasks in a community. Once the Industrial Revolution began, there was no such thing as equal and high valued work(er) in a mass production industry. The only value these workers had were the wage they made. That meant the wives lost their value at home and had to start working for a living. This new system created the thought of everyone being replaceable.

Life of a worker 
The life of a worker was a challenging one. Working 12 to 14-hour days, 6 days a week, and in a dangerous environment. The worst part was the infrequency of pay or not being paid at all. At times, employers paid their workers in script pay, non-U.S. currency, or even in-store credit.

See also

References 

Consumer behaviour